Zverosovkhoz is a rural locality (an inhabited locality) under the administrative jurisdiction of the urban-type settlement of Kildinstroy in Kolsky District of Murmansk Oblast, Russia, located on the Kola Peninsula beyond the Arctic Circle. Population: 1,598 (2010 Census).

References

Notes

Sources

Rural localities in Murmansk Oblast